Santiago Daniel Merlo Rosadilla (born 30 August 1998) is a Uruguayan professional footballer who plays as a defender for Villa Española.

Career
Merlo is a former youth academy player of Nacional. He was part of Nacional's 2018 U-20 Copa Libertadores winning squad. He joined Cerro Largo on a free transfer prior to the 2020 season. He made his professional debut for the club on 12 September 2020 in a 2–1 league win against Progreso.

In August 2021, Merlo joined Villa Española.

Career statistics

Club

Honours
Nacional U20
U-20 Copa Libertadores: 2018

References

External links
 

1998 births
Living people
Association football defenders
Uruguayan footballers
Uruguayan Primera División players
Cerro Largo F.C. players